The 1957 Arizona State Sun Devils football team was an American football team that represented Arizona State College (later renamed Arizona State University) in the Border Conference during the 1957 NCAA University Division football season. In their third and final season under head coach Dan Devine, the Sun Devils compiled a 10–0 record (4–0 against Border opponents), won the conference championship, were ranked No. 12 in the final AP Poll, and outscored their opponents by a combined total of 397 to 66. They were the first team in school history to finish the season ranked in any poll.

The team's statistical leaders included John Hangartner with 1,203 passing yards, Leon Burton with 1,126 rushing yards, and Clancy Osborne with 351 receiving yards. Burton led the country in both rushing yards and scoring (96 points). Teammate Bobby Mulgado ranked second in the country behind Burton with 93 points.

Cecil Coleman, Tom Fletcher, Frank Kush, and Al Onofrio were assistant coaches. The team captains were halfback Bobby Mulgado and tight end Clarence Osborne.  The Sun Devils finished 6-0 at home and 4-0 on the road. Home games were played at Goodwin Stadium in Tempe, Arizona.

Schedule

Game summaries
In the season opener on September 21, 1957, Arizona defeated Wichita State, 28-0, on the road. The Sun Devils held Wichita State to only nine passing yards and 61 total yards.  

In their home opener on September 28 at Goodwin Stadium, the Sun Devils defeated Idaho, 19-7.  

On October 5, Arizona State recorded a 44-6 road win over San Jose State.  

The Devils beat Hardin-Simmons, 35-26, in Tempe on October 12.  

Following a bye week, Arizona State dominated San Diego State in a 66-0 road shutout victory on October 26.  The Sun Devils scored nine rushing touchdowns and 10 touchdowns overall, tying single-game school records.  

On November 2, the Sun Devils delivered a 21-0 home shutout win against New Mexico State.  

Arizona State prevailed for a 43-7 road victory over Texas Western on November 9.  

The Devils beat Montana State, 53-13, at Goodwin Stadium on November 16.  This was the first meeting between the two football programs.  

On November 23, Arizona State defeated Pacific, 41-0, in Tempe.  It was the team's fourth shutout win of the season.  

In the Arizona–Arizona State football rivalry game played on November 30 at Goodwin Stadium, the Sun Devils dominated Arizona, 47-7.

Roster
Arizona State usual offensive lineup included wide receiver Bill Spanko, left tackle Bart Jankans, left guard Al Carr, center Dave Fonner, right guard Ken Kerr, right tackle Tom Ford, tight end Clarence Osborne, quarterback John Hangartner, halfback Bobby Mulgado (#27), fullback Joe Belland, and wingback Leon Burton. Joe Drake, Charley Jones, Karl Kiefer, Fran Urban, John Vucichevich, and Paul Widmer were also on the roster.

Individual and team statistics
Arizona State's individual statistical leaders included:

 Rushing: Leon Burton, 117 carries for 1,126 rushing yards, 9.6 yard average, and 12 rushing touchdowns;

 Passing: John Hangartner, 61 of 100 passing, 1,203 passing yards, 61.0% completion percentage, 14 passing touchdowns, and seven interceptions;

 Scoring: Leon Burton, 96 points on 16 touchdowns;

 Receiving: Clarence Osborne, 20 receptions for 351 yards and three touchdowns;

 Interceptions: Bobby Mulgado, six interceptions for 113 return yards;

 Punting: Bobby Mulgado, 24 punts for 878 yards and a 36.6 yard average;

 Kickoff returns: Joe Belland, six returns for 112 yards; and

 Punt returns: Bobby Mulgado, 14 returns for 267 yards and two touchdowns.

Arizona State team statistics included the following:
 Rushing yards: 292.2 yards per game on offense, 102.9 yards allowed per game on defense;

 Passing yards: 152.7 yards per game on offense, 124.0 yards allowed per game on defense;

 Total offense: 444.9 yards per game on offense, 216.6 yards allowed per game on defense;

 Scoring: 39.7 points per game on offense, 6.6 points allowed per game on defense;

 First downs: 182 first downs on offense, 138 first downs allowed on defense.

 Punts: 29 total punts for an average of 35.4 yards, while opponents recorded 66 total punts for an average of 32.8 yards.

The Sun Devils' defense set multiple school records during the 1957 season, including the lowest point total allowed in a season (66), fewest yards allowed per game (216.6), fewest points allowed per game (6.6), and fewest touchdowns allowed in a season (10).  The team also recorded the fewest punts in a season (29) and fewest punt yards in a season (1,028 Yds). Quarterback John Hangartner set a single-season school record by averaging 12.03 passing yards per attempt.

Awards and honors
Four Arizona State players received first-team honors on the 1957 All-Border Conference football team: wingback Leon Burton, center Dave Fonner, right guard Ken Kerr, and wide receiver Bill Spanko. Burton also played in the 1957 East–West Shrine Game.

Team awards were presented to halfback Bobby Mulgado (Sun Angel Award) and center Dave Fonner (Cecil Abonor Captains Award).

References

Arizona State
Arizona State Sun Devils football seasons
Border Conference football champion seasons
College football undefeated seasons
Arizona State Sun Devils football